13 Bankers: The Wall Street Takeover and the Next Financial Meltdown is a 2010 book written by economist Simon Johnson and historian James Kwak. According to economist C. Fred Bergsten, the book offers an analysis of the financial crisis of 2007–2009.

References

External links
 

Books about economic history
Pantheon Books books